Schools of Islamic theology are various Islamic schools and branches in different schools of thought regarding ʿaqīdah (creed). The main schools of Islamic Theology include the Qadariyah, Falasifa, Jahmiyya, Murji'ah, Muʿtazila, Batiniyya, Ashʿarī, Māturīdī, and Aṯharī.

The main schism between Sunnī, Shīʿa, and Kharijite branches of Islam was initially more political than theological, but over time theological differences have developed throughout the history of Islam.

Divinity schools in Islam 

According to the Encyclopaedia of the Qurʾān (2006), "The Qurʾān displays a wide range of theological topics related to the religious thought of late antiquity and through its prophet Muḥammad presents a coherent vision of the creator, the cosmos and man. The main issues of Muslim theological dispute prove to be hidden under the wording of the qurʾānic message, which is closely tied to Muḥammad's biography". However, modern historians and scholars of Islamic studies recognize that some instances of theological thought were already developed among polytheistic Pagans in pre-Islamic Arabia, such as the belief in fatalism (ḳadar), which reoccurs in Islamic theology regarding the metaphysical debates on the attributes of God in Islam, predestination, and human free-will.

The original schism between Kharijites, Sunnīs, and Shīʿas among Muslims was disputed over the political and religious succession to the guidance of the Muslim community (Ummah) after the death of the Islamic prophet Muhammad. From their essentially political position, the Kharijites developed extreme doctrines that set them apart from both mainstream Sunnī and Shīʿa Muslims. Shīʿas believe ʿAlī ibn Abī Ṭālib is the true successor to Muhammad, while Sunnīs consider Abu Bakr to hold that position. The Kharijites broke away from both the Shīʿas and the Sunnīs during the First Fitna (the first Islamic Civil War); they were particularly noted for adopting a radical approach to takfīr (excommunication), whereby they declared both Sunnī and Shīʿa Muslims to be either infidels (kuffār) or false Muslims (munāfiḳūn), and therefore deemed them worthy of death for their perceived apostasy (ridda).

ʿAqīdah is an Islamic term meaning "creed" or "belief". Any religious belief system, or creed, can be considered an example of ʿaqīdah. However, this term has taken a significant technical usage in Muslim history and theology, denoting those matters over which Muslims hold conviction. The term is usually translated as "theology". Such traditions are divisions orthogonal to sectarian divisions within Islam, and a Muʿtazilite may, for example, belong to the Jaʿfari, Zaydī, or even Ḥanafī schools of Islamic jurisprudence.

One of the earliest systematic schools of Islamic theology to develop was the Muʿtazila in the mid-8th century CE. Muʿtazilites emphasized the use of reason and rational thought, positing that the injunctions of God are accessible through rational thought and inquiry, and affirmed that the Quran was created (makhlūq) rather than co-eternal with God, which would develop into one of the most contentious questions in the history of Islamic theology. In the 10th century CE, the Ashʿarī school developed as a response to the Muʿtazila. Ashʿarītes still taught the use of reason in understanding the Quran, but denied the possibility to deduce moral truths by reasoning. This position was opposed by the Māturīdī school, which taught that certain moral truths may be found by the use of reason alone, without the aid of revelation.

Another point of contention was the relative position of imān ("faith") contrasted with taqwā ("piety"). Such schools of Islamic theology are summarized under ʿIlm al-Kalām, or "science of discourse", as opposed to mystical schools who deny that any theological truth may be discovered by means of discourse or reason.

Sunnī schools of theology 

"Most Sunnis have adopted" the Ash‘ariyya school of theology,   but the similar Mātūrīd’iyyah school also has Sunni adherents.
Sunni Muslims are the largest denomination of Islam and are known as Ahl as-Sunnah wa’l-Jamā‘h or simply as Ahl as-Sunnah. The word Sunni comes from the word sunnah, which means the teachings and actions or examples of the Islamic prophet Muhammad. Therefore, the term "Sunni" refers to those who follow or maintain the sunnah of the prophet Muhammad.

The Sunnis believe that Muhammad did not appoint a successor to lead the Muslim ummah (community) before his death, and after an initial period of confusion, a group of his most prominent companions gathered and elected Abu Bakr, Muhammad's close friend and a father-in-law, as the first caliph of Islam. Sunni Muslims regard the first four caliphs (Abu Bakr, `Umar ibn al-Khattāb, Uthman Ibn Affan and Ali ibn Abu Talib) as "al-Khulafā’ur-Rāshidūn" or "The Rightly Guided Caliphs". After the Rashidun, the position turned into a hereditary right and the caliph's role was limited to being a political symbol of Muslim strength and unity.

Athari 

Atharism (textualism) is a movement of Islamic scholars who reject rationalistic Islamic theology (kalam) in favor of strict textualism in interpreting the Quran. The name is derived from the Arabic word , literally meaning "remnant" and also referring to a "narrative". Their disciples are called the Athariyya, or Atharis.

For followers of the Athari movement, the "clear" meaning of the Qur'an, and especially the prophetic traditions, has sole authority in matters of belief, and to engage in rational disputation (kalam), even if one arrives at the truth, is absolutely forbidden. Atharis engage in an amodal reading of the Quran, as opposed to one engaged in ta'wil (metaphorical interpretation). They do not attempt to conceptualize the meanings of the Quran rationally, and believe that the "real" meaning should be consigned to God alone (tafwid). In essence, the meaning has been accepted without asking "how" or "Bi-la kaifa".

On the other hand, the famous Hanbali scholar Ibn al-Jawzi states, in Kitab Akhbar as-Sifat, that Ahmad ibn Hanbal would have been opposed to anthropomorphic interpretations of Quranic texts such as those of al-Qadi Abu Ya'la, Ibn Hamid, and Ibn az-Zaghuni. Based on Abu'l-Faraj ibn al-Jawzi's criticism of Athari-Hanbalis, Muhammad Abu Zahra, a Professor of Islamic law at Cairo University deduced that the Salafi aqidah is located somewhere between ta'tili and anthropopathy (Absolute Ẓāhirīsm in understanding the tashbih in Qur'an) in Islam. Absolute Ẓāhirīsm and total rejection of ta'wil are amongst the fundamental characteristics of this "new" Islamic school of theology.

ʿIlm al-Kalām 

ʿIlm al-Kalām (literally "science of discourse"), usually foreshortened to kalām and sometimes called "Islamic scholastic theology" or "speculative theology", is a rational undertaking born out of the need to establish and defend the tenets of Islamic faith against doubters and detractors. ʿIlm al-Kalām incorporates Aristotelian reasoning and logic into Islamic theology. A Muslim scholar of kalām is referred to as a mutakallim (plural: mutakallimūn) as distinguished from philosophers, jurists, and scientists. There are many possible interpretations as to why this discipline was originally called kalām; one is that the widest controversy in this discipline has been about whether the Word of God, as revealed in the Quran, can be considered part of God's essence and therefore not created, or whether it was made into words in the normal sense of speech, and is therefore created. There are many schools of Kalam, the main ones being the Mutazila, the Ash'ari and Maturidi schools in Sunni Islam. Traditionalist theology rejects the use of kalam, regarding humans reason as sinful in unseen matters.

Muʿtazila 

Muʿtazila is a school of theology that appeared in early Islāmic history and were known for their neutrality in the dispute between Alī and his opponents after the death of the third caliph, Uthman.  By the 10th century CE the term had also come to refer to an Islamic school of speculative theology (kalām) that flourished in Basra and Baghdad (8th–10th century). According to Sunni sources, Muʿtazili theology originated in the eighth century in Basra (now in Iraq) when Wāṣil ibn ʿAṭā' (died 131 AH/748 AD) withdrew (iʿtazala, hence the name Mu'tazila) from the teaching lessons of Hasan al-Basri after a theological dispute regarding the issue of al-Manzilah bayna al-Manzilatayn (a position between two positions), where Wasil ibn Ata reasoned that a grave sinner (fāsiq) could be classed neither as believer nor unbeliever but was in an intermediate position (al-manzilah bayna manzilatayn). 

The later Mu'tazila school developed an Islamic type of rationalism, partly influenced by Ancient Greek philosophy, based around three fundamental principles: the oneness (Tawhid) and justice (Al-'adl) of God, human freedom of action, and the creation of the Quran. The Muʿtazilites are best known for rejecting the doctrine of the Quran as uncreated and co-eternal with God, asserting that if the Quran is the word of God, he logically "must have preceded his own speech". This went against the orthodox Sunni position which argued that with God being all knowing, his knowledge of the Quran must have been eternal, hence uncreated just like him. Though Muʿtazilis later relied on logic and different aspects of early Islamic philosophy, ancient Greek philosophy, and Indian philosophy, the basics of Islam is their starting point and ultimate reference.

Several groups were later influenced by Muʿtazilite theology, such as the Bishriyya, who followed the teachings of Bishr ibn al-Mu'tamir, and the Bahshamiyya, who followed the teachings of Abu Hashim al-Jubba'i.

Ashʿarīyyah 

Ashʿarīyyah is a school of theology that was founded by the Arab Muslim scholar, reformer, and scholastic theologian Abū al-Ḥasan al-Ashʿarī in the 9th–10th century who developed the school of thought founded by Ibn Kullab a century earlier. 

It established an orthodox guideline based on scriptural authority, rationality, and theological rationalism. As a young man, al-Ashʿarī studied under al-Jubba'i, a renowned teacher of Muʿtazilite theology and philosophy. He was noted for his teachings on atomism, among the earliest Islamic philosophies, and for al-Ashʿarī this was the basis for propagating the view that God created every moment in time and every particle of matter. He nonetheless believed in free will, elaborating the thoughts of Dirar ibn 'Amr and Abu Hanifa into a "dual agent" or "acquisition" (iktisab) account of free will.

Al-Ashʿarī established a middle way between the doctrines of the Aṯharī and Muʿtazila schools of Islamic theology, based both on reliance on the sacred scriptures of Islam and theological rationalism concerning the agency and attributes of God. The Ashʿarī school reasoned that truth can only be known through revelation, and that without revelation the unaided human mind wouldn't be able to know if something is good or evil. It has been called "an attempt to create a middle position" between the rationalism of the Muʿtazilites and scripturalism of the traditionalists. In an attempt to explain how God has power and control over everything, but humans are responsible for their sins, al-Ashʿarī developed the doctrine of kasb (acquisition), whereby any and all human acts, even the raising of a finger, are created by God, but the human being who performs the act is responsible for it, because they have "acquired" the act. While al-Ashʿarī opposed the views of the rival Muʿtazilite school, he was also opposed to the view which rejected all debate, held by certain schools such as the Zahiri ("literalist"), Mujassimite ("anthropotheist"), and Muhaddithin ("traditionalist") schools for their over-emphasis on taqlid (imitation) in his Istihsan al‑Khaud.

Ashʿarism eventually became the predominant school of theological thought within Sunnī Islam, and is regarded by some as the single most important school of Islamic theology in the history of Islam. Amongst the most famous Ashʿarite theologians are Imam Nawawi, Ibn Hajar al-Asqalani, Ibn al-Jawzi, al-Ghazali, al-Suyuti, Izz al-Din ibn 'Abd al-Salam, Fakhr al-Din al-Razi, Ibn 'Asakir, al-Subki, al-Taftazani, al-Baqillani and al-Bayhaqi.

Mātūrīd’iyyah 

The Maturidi school was founded by Abu Mansur al-Maturidi, and is the most popular theological school amongst Muslims, especially in the areas formerly controlled by the Ottomans and the Mughals. Today, the Maturidi school is the position favored by the Ahl ar-Ra'y ("people of reason"), which includes only the Hanafi school of fiqh who make up the majority of Sunni Muslims.

The Maturidi school takes the middle position between the Ash'ari and Mu'tazili schools on the questions of knowing truth and free will. The Maturidis say that the unaided human mind is able to find out that some of the more major sins such as alcohol or murder are evil without the help of revelation, but still maintain that revelation is the ultimate source of knowledge. Additionally, the Maturidi believe that God created and can control all of His creation, but that He allows humans to make individual decisions and choices for themselves.

Ethics are considered to have objective existence. Humans are thus capable of recognizing good and bad without revelation, but reason alone. However, prophets and revelation are necessary to explain matters beyond human reason. In matters of the six articles of faith, Māturīdism notably holds the idea that paradise and hell coexist with the current world, and does not adhere to the doctrine of impeccability of angels.

Jahmiyyah 

Jahmis were the followers of the Islamic theologian Jahm bin Safwan who associate himself with Al-Harith ibn Surayj. He was an exponent of extreme determinism according to which a man acts only metaphorically in the same way in which the sun acts or does something when it sets. This is the position adopted by the Ash'ari school, which holds that God's omnipotence is absolute and perfect over all creation.

Qadariyyah 

Qadariyyah is an originally derogatory term designating early Islamic theologians who asserted human beings are ontologically free and have a perfect free will, whose exercise justifies divine punishment and absolving God of responsibility for evil in the world. Their doctrines were adopted by the Mu'tazilis and rejected by the Ash'aris. The tension between free will and God's omnipotence was later reconciled by the Maturidi school of theology, which asserted that God grants human beings their agency, but can remove or otherwise alter it at any time.

Muhakkima 

The groups that were seceded from Ali's army in the end of the Arbitration Incident constituted the branch of Muhakkima. They are mainly divided into two major sects called as Kharijites and Ibadis.

Khawarij 

The Kharijites considered the caliphate of Abu Bakr and Umar to be rightly guided but believed that Uthman ibn Affan had deviated from the path of justice and truth in the last days of his caliphate, and hence was liable to be killed or displaced.  They also believed that Ali ibn Abi Talib committed a grave sin when he agreed on the arbitration with Muʿāwiyah. In the Battle of Siffin, Ali acceded to Muawiyah's suggestion to stop the fighting and resort to negotiation. A large portion of Ali's troops (who later became the first Kharijites) refused to concede to that agreement, and they considered that Ali had breached a Qur'anic verse which states that The decision is only for Allah (Qur'an 6:57), which the Kharijites interpreted to mean that the outcome of a conflict can only be decided in battle (by God) and not in negotiations (by human beings).

The Kharijites thus deemed the arbitrators (Abu Musa al-Ashʿari and Amr Ibn Al-As), the leaders who appointed these arbitrators (Ali and Muʿāwiyah) and all those who agreed on the arbitration (all companions of Ali and Muʿāwiyah) as Kuffār (disbelievers), having breached the rules of the Qur'an. They believed that all participants in the Battle of Jamal, including Talha, Zubayr (both being companions of Muhammad) and Aisha had committed a Kabira (major sin in Islam).

Kharijites reject the doctrine of infallibility for the leader of the Muslim community, in contrast to Shi'a but in agreement with Sunnis. Modern-day Islamic scholar Abul Ala Maududi wrote an analysis of Kharijite beliefs, marking a number of differences between Kharijism and Sunni Islam. The Kharijites believed that the act of sinning is analogous to Kufr (disbelief) and that every grave sinner was regarded as a Kāfir (disbeliever) unless he repents. With this argument, they denounced all the above-mentioned Ṣaḥābah and even cursed and used abusive language against them. Ordinary Muslims were also declared disbelievers because first, they were not free of sin; secondly they regarded the above-mentioned Ṣaḥābah as believers and considered them as religious leaders, even inferring Islamic jurisprudence from the Hadeeth narrated by them. They also believed that it is not a must for the caliph to be from the Quraysh. Any pious Muslim nominated by other Muslims could be an eligible caliph. Additionally, Kharijites believed that obedience to the caliph is binding as long as he is managing the affairs with justice and consultation, but if he deviates, then it becomes obligatory to confront him, demote him and even kill him.

Ibadiyya 

Ibadiyya has some common beliefs overlapping with the Ashʿarī and Mu'tazila schools, mainstream Sunni Islam, and some Shīʿīte sects.

Murji'ah 

Murji'ah was an early Islamic school whose followers are known in English as "Murjites" or "Murji'ites". The Murji'ah emerged as a theological school in response to the Kharijites on the early question about the relationship between sin and apostasy (rida). The Murji'ah believed that sin did not affect a person's beliefs (iman) but rather their piety (taqwa). Therefore, they advocated the idea of "delayed judgement", (irjaa). The Murji'ah maintain that anyone who proclaims the bare minimum of faith must be considered a Muslim, and sin alone cannot cause someone to become a disbeliever (kafir). The Murjite opinion would eventually dominate that of the Kharijites and become the mainstream opinion in Sunni Islam. The later schools of Sunni theology adopted their stance while form more developed theological schools and concepts.

Shīʿa schools of theology

Zaydi-Fivers 
The Zaydi denomination of Shīʿa Islam is close to the Muʿtazila school in matters of theological doctrine. There are a few issues between both schools, most notably the Zaydi doctrine of the Imamate, which is rejected by the Muʿtazilites. Amongst the Shīʿa, Zaydis are most similar to Sunnīs, since Zaydism shares similar doctrines and jurisprudential opinions with Sunnī scholars.

Bāṭin’iyyah 

The Bāṭen’iyyah was originally introduced by Abu’l-Khāttāb Muhammad ibn Abu Zaynab al-Asadī, and later developed by Maymūn al-Qaddāh and his son ʿAbd Allāh ibn Maymūn for the esoteric interpretation of the Quran. The members of Bāṭen’iyyah may belong to either the Ismāʿīlī or Twelver denominations of Shīʿa Islam.

Imami-Ismā'īlīs 

The Ismāʿīlīs differ from Twelvers because they had living imams or da'is for centuries. They followed Isma'il ibn Jafar, elder brother of Musa al-Kadhim, as the rightful Imam after his father Ja'far al-Sadiq. The Ismailis believe that whether Imam Ismail did or did not die before Imam Ja'far, he had passed on the mantle of the imāmate to his son Muḥammad ibn Ismā'īl al-Maktum as the next imam.

Batini-Twelver ʿAqīdah schools 

The followers of Bāṭen’iyyah-Twelver school consist of Alevis and Nusayris, who developed their own system of Islamic jurisprudence and do not pursue the Ja'fari jurisprudence. Their combined population is nearly around 1% of the global Muslim population.

Alevism 

Alevis are sometimes categorized as part of Twelver Shīʿīsm, and sometimes as its own religious tradition, as it has markedly different philosophy, customs, and rituals. They have many Tasawwufī characteristics and express belief in the Qur'an and The Twelve Imams, but reject polygamy and accept religious traditions predating Islam, like Turkic shamanism. They are significant in East-Central Turkey. They are sometimes considered a Sufi brotherhood, and have an untraditional form of religious leadership that is not scholarship-oriented like other Sunnī and Shīʿa groups. 7 to 11 million Alevis, including the other denominations of Twelver Shīʿītes, live in Anatolia.

Alevi Islamic school of divinity 

In Turkey, Shīʿa Muslims follow the Ja'fari jurisprudence, which tracks back to the sixth Shia Imam Ja'far al-Sadiq, and are called "Ja'faris".
 The Alevi-Turks have a unique and perplex conviction tracing back to the Kaysanites and Khurramites which are considered as Ghulat Shīʿītes. According to Turkish scholar Abdülbaki Gölpınarlı, the Qizilbash ("Red-Heads") of the 16th century – a religious and political movement in Azerbaijan that helped to establish the Safavid dynasty – were "spiritual descendants of the Khurramites".
 Their aqidah (theological conviction) is based upon a syncretic fiqh system called as "Batiniyya-Sufism" which incorporates some Qarmatian sentiments, originally introduced by "Abu’l-Khāttāb Muhammad ibn Abu Zaynab al-Asadī", and later developed by Maymun al-Qāddāh and his son ʿAbd Allāh ibn Maymun.
 On the other hand, the members of Bektashi Order have a conviction of "Batiniyya Isma'ilism" and "Hurufism" with a strong belief in The Twelve Imams.
 In conclusion, Qizilbash-Alevis are not  a part of Ja'fari jurisprudence fiqh, even though they can be considered as members of different Tariqa of Shia Islam all looks like sub-classes of Twelver. Their conviction includes "Batiniyya-Hurufism" and "Sevener-Qarmatians-Ismailism" sentiments.
 The Twelver branch of Shia Islam Muslim population of Turkey is composed of Mu'tazila aqidah of Ja'fari jurisprudence madhhab, Batiniyya-Sufism aqidah of Maymūn’al-Qāddāhī fiqh of the Alevīs, and Cillī aqidah of Maymūn ibn Abu’l-Qāsim Sulaiman ibn Ahmad ibn at-Tabarānī fiqh of the Alawites.

ʿAqīdah of Alevi-Islam Dīn Services  
 

Some of their members (or sub-groups) claim that God takes abode in the bodies of the human-beings (ḥulūl), believe in metempsychosis (tanāsukh), and consider Islamic law to be not obligatory (ibāḥa), similar to antinomianism.
Some of the Alevis criticizes the course of Islam as it is being practiced overwhelmingly by more than 99% of Sunni and Shia population.
They believe that major additions had been implemented during the time of Umayyads, and easily refuse some basic principles on the grounds that they believe it contradicts with the holy book of Islam, namely the Qur'an.
Regular daily salat and fasting in the holy month of Ramadan are officially not accepted by some members of Alevism.
Some of their sub-groups like Ishikists and Bektashis, who portrayed themselves as Alevis, neither comprehend the essence of the regular daily salat (prayers) and fasting in the holy month of Ramadan that is frequently accentuated at many times in Quran, nor admits that these principles constitute the ineluctable foundations of the Dīn of Islam as they had been laid down by Allah and they had been practised in an uninterruptible manner during the period of Prophet Muhammad.

Baktāshism (Bektaşilik)

Baktāshi Islamic School of Divinity 

The Bektashiyyah is a Shia Sufi order founded in the 13th century by Haji Bektash Veli, a dervish who escaped Central Asia and found refuge with the Seljuks in Anatolia at the time of the Mongol invasions (1219–23). This order gained a great following in rural areas and it later developed in two branches: the Çelebi clan, who claimed to be physical descendants of Haji Bektash Veli, were called "Bel evladları" (children of the loins), and became the hereditary spiritual leaders of the rural Alevis; and the Babağan, those faithful to the path "Yol evladları" (children of the way), who dominated the official Bektashi Sufi order with its elected leadership.

Bektashism places much emphasis on the concept of Wahdat-ul-Wujood وحدة الوجود, the "Unity of Being" that was formulated by Ibn Arabi. This has often been labeled as pantheism, although it is a concept closer to panentheism. Bektashism is also heavily permeated with Shiite concepts, such as the marked veneration of Ali, The Twelve Imams, and the ritual commemoration of Ashurah marking the Battle of Karbala. The old Persian holiday of Nowruz is celebrated by Bektashis as Imam Ali's birthday.

In keeping with the central belief of Wahdat-ul-Wujood the Bektashi see reality contained in Haqq-Muhammad-Ali, a single unified entity. Bektashi do not consider this a form of trinity. There are many other practices and ceremonies that share similarity with other faiths, such as a ritual meal (muhabbet) and yearly confession of sins to a baba (magfirat-i zunub مغفرة الذنوب). Bektashis base their practices and rituals on their non-orthodox and mystical interpretation and understanding of the Qur'an and the prophetic practice (Sunnah). They have no written doctrine specific to them, thus rules and rituals may differ depending on under whose influence one has been taught. Bektashis generally revere Sufi mystics outside of their own order, such as Ibn Arabi, Al-Ghazali and Jelalludin Rumi who are close in spirit to them.

The Baktāshi ʿaqīdah 

The Bektashi Order is a Sufi order and shares much in common with other Islamic mystical movements, such as the need for an experienced spiritual guide — called a baba in Bektashi parlance — as well as the doctrine of "the four gates that must be traversed": the "Sharia" (religious law), "Tariqah" (the spiritual path), "Haqiqah" (truth), and "Marifa" (true knowledge).

Bektashis hold that the Qur'an has two levels of meaning: an outer (Zāher ظاهر) and an inner (bāṭen باطن). They hold the latter to be superior and eternal and this is reflected in their understanding of both the universe and humanity, which is a view that can also be found in Ismailism and Batiniyya.

Bektashism is also initiatic and members must traverse various levels or ranks as they progress along the spiritual path to the Reality. First level members are called aşıks عاشق. They are those who, while not having taken initiation into the order, are nevertheless drawn to it. Following initiation (called nasip) one becomes a mühip محب. After some time as a mühip, one can take further vows and become a dervish. The next level above dervish is that of baba. The baba (lit. father) is considered to be the head of a tekke and qualified to give spiritual guidance (irshad إرشاد). Above the baba is the rank of halife-baba (or dede, grandfather). Traditionally there were twelve of these, the most senior being the dedebaba (great-grandfather). The dedebaba was considered to be the highest ranking authority in the Bektashi Order. Traditionally the residence of the dedebaba was the Pir Evi (The Saint's Home) which was located in the shrine of Hajji Bektash Wali in the central Anatolian town of Hacıbektaş (Solucakarahüyük).

Ithnā'ashariyyah 

Twelvers believe in the twelve Shīʿa Imams. The twelfth Imam is believed to be in occultation, and will appear again just before the Qiyamah (Islamic view of the Last Judgment). The Shia hadiths include the sayings of the Imams. Many Muslims criticise the Shia for certain beliefs and practices, including practices such as the Mourning of Muharram (Mätam). They are the largest Shia school of thought (93%), predominant in Azerbaijan, Iran, Iraq, Lebanon, and Bahrain and have a significant population in Pakistan, India, Afghanistan, Kuwait and the Eastern province of Saudi Arabia. The Twelver Shīʿas are followers of either the Jaf'ari or Batiniyyah madh'habs.

Imami-Ja'faris 

Followers of the Jaf'ari madh'hab are divided into the following sub-divisions, all of them are the followers of the Theology of Twelvers:

Usulism 
The Usuli form the overwhelming majority within the Twelver Shia denomination. They follow a Marja-i Taqlid on the subject of taqlid and fiqh. They are concentrated in Iran, Pakistan, Azerbaijan, India, Iraq, and Lebanon.

Akhbarism 
Akhbari, similar to Usulis, however reject ijtihad in favor of hadith. Concentrated in Bahrain.

Shaykhism 
Shaykhism is an Islamic religious movement founded by Shaykh Ahmad in the early 19th century Qajar dynasty, Iran, now retaining a minority following in Iran and Iraq. It began from a combination of Sufi and Shia and Akhbari doctrines. In the mid 19th-century many Shaykhis converted to the Bábí and Baháʼí religions, which regard Shaykh Ahmad highly.

Ghulāt-Imamis

‘Alawism

Alawites are also called Nusayris, Nusairis, Namiriya or Ansariyya. Their madhhab is established by Ibn Nusayr, and their aqidah is developed by Al-Khaṣībī. They follow Cillī aqidah of "Maymūn ibn Abu’l-Qāsim Sulaiman ibn Ahmad ibn at-Tabarānī fiqh" of the ‘Alawis. One million three hundred and fifty thousand of them lived in Syria and Lebanon in 1970. It is estimated they are 10–12% of the population of Syria of 23 million in 2013.

‘Alawite Islamic School of Divinity 
Alawites consider themselves to be Muslims, although some Sunnis dispute that they are. Alawite doctrine  incorporates Gnostic, neo-Platonic, Islamic, Christian and other elements and has, therefore, been described as syncretistic. Their theology is based on a divine triad, or trinity, which is the core of Alawite belief. The triad comprises three emanations of the one God: the supreme aspect or entity called the "Essence" or the "Meaning" (both being translations of ma'na), together with two lesser emanations known as his "Name" (ism), or "Veil" (hijab), and his "Gate" (bab). These emanations have manifested themselves in different human forms over several cycles in history, the last cycle of which was as Ali (the Essence/Meaning), Muhammad (the Name) and Salman the Persian (the Gate). Alawite belief is summarised in the formula: "I turn to the Gate; I bow before the Name; I adore the Meaning". The claim that Alawites believe Ali is a deity has been contested by some scholars as a misrepresentation on the basis that Ali is, in fact, considered an "essence or form", not a human being, by which believers can "grasp God". Alawites also hold that they were originally stars or divine lights that were cast out of heaven through disobedience and must undergo repeated reincarnation (or metempsychosis) before returning to heaven. They can be reincarnated as Christians or others through sin and as animals if they become infidels.

Alawite beliefs have never been confirmed by their modern religious authorities. Alawites tend to conceal their beliefs (taqiyya) due to historical persecution. Some tenets of the faith are secret, known only to a select few; therefore, they have been described as a mystical sect. In addition to Islamic festivals, the Alawites have been reported to celebrate or honor certain Christian festivals such as the birth of Jesus and Palm Sunday. Their most-important feast is Eid al-Ghadeer.

The ‘Alawite ʿaqīdah
Alawites have always described themselves as being Twelver Shi'ite Muslims and have been recognized as such by the prominent Lebanese Shi'ite cleric Musa al-Sadr.<ref name="Kramer">{{cite web|url=http://www.martinkramer.org/sandbox/reader/archives/syria-alawis-and-shiism/|title=Syria's Alawis and Shi'ism|last=Kramer|first=Martin|date=11 January 2010|quote=In their mountainous corner of Syria, the 'Alawī claim to represent the furthest extension of Twelver Shi'ism.|access-date=2 August 2014|archive-date=24 December 2018|archive-url=https://web.archive.org/web/20181224211635/http://martinkramer.org/sandbox/reader/archives/syria-alawis-and-shiism/|url-status=live}}</ref> The Sunni Grand Mufti of Jerusalem Haj Amin al-Husseini issued a fatwa recognising them as part of the Muslim community in the interest of Arab nationalism. However, Athari Sunni (modern day Salafis) scholars such as Ibn Kathir (a disciple of Ibn Taymiyya) have categorised Alawites as pagans in their writings.

Barry Rubin has suggested that Syrian leader Hafiz al-Assad and his son and successor Bashar al-Assad pressed their fellow Alawites "to behave like regular Muslims, shedding (or at least concealing) their distinctive aspects". During the early 1970s a booklet, al-`Alawiyyun Shi'atu Ahl al-Bait ("The Alawites are Followers of the Household of the Prophet") was published, which was "signed by numerous 'Alawi' men of religion", described the doctrines of the Imami Shia as Alawite.  Additionally, there has been a recent movement to unite Alawism and the other branches of Twelver Islam through educational exchange programs in Syria and Qom.

Some sources have discussed the "Sunnification" of Alawites under the al-Assad regime. Joshua Landis, director of the Center for Middle East Studies, writes that Hafiz al-Assad "tried to turn Alawites into 'good' (read Sunnified) Muslims in exchange for preserving a modicum of secularism and tolerance in society". On the other hand, Al-Assad "declared the Alawites to be nothing but Twelver Shiites". In a paper, "Islamic Education in Syria", Landis wrote that "no mention" is made in Syrian textbooks (controlled by the Al-Assad regime) of Alawites, Druze, Ismailis or Shia Islam; Islam was presented as a monolithic religion. Ali Sulayman al-Ahmad, chief judge of the Baathist Syrian state, has said: 

 Kızılbaşlık 

 The Qizilbash ʿaqīdah 

Qizilbash and Bektashi tariqah shared common religious beliefs and practices becoming intermingled as Alevis in spite of many local variations. Isolated from both the Sunni Ottomans and the Twelver Shi`a Safavids, Qizilbash and Bektashi developed traditions, practices, and doctrines by the early 17th century which marked them as a closed autonomous religious community. As a result of the immense pressures to conform to Sunni Islam, all members of Alevism developed a tradition of opposition (ibāḥa) to all forms of external religion.

The doctrine of Qizilbashism is well explained in the following poem written by the Shaykh of Safaviyya tariqah Shāh Ismāʿil Khatai:

The lines of poetry above may easily be judged as an act of  "Shirk" (polytheism) by the Sunni Ulama, but they have a bāṭenī taʾwīl (inner explanation) in Qizilbashism. 

 Tashbih 

 Karram’iyyah Anthropomorphic-Anthropopathic Karram’iyyah was founded by Abū ʿAbd Allāh Muḥammad b. Karrām. Ibn Karram considered that God was a substance and that He had a body (jism'') finite in certain directions when He comes into contact with the Throne.

Anthropopathy in the history of Ghulāt Shīʿīsm 

The belief of Incarnation was first emerged in Sabaʾiyya, and later some personalities like Muhammad ibn al-Hanafiyyah, Abu Muslim, Sunpadh, Ishaq al-Turk, Al-Muqanna, Babak Khorramdin, Maziar and Ismail I had become the subject of God incarnates.

Ahmadiyya 

The Ahmadis' beliefs are more aligned with the Sunni tradition,  such as The Five Pillars of Islam and The Six articles of Islamic Faith. Likewise, Ahmadis accept the Qur'an as their holy text, face the Kaaba during prayer, accept the authority of Hadiths (reported sayings of and stories about Muhammad) and practice the Sunnah (traditions) of Muhammad. However, Many Muslims consider Ahmadis as heretics.

Ahmadi teachings state that the founders of all the major world religions had divine origins. God was working towards the establishment of Islam as the final religion, because it was the most complete and included all the previous teachings of other religion (but they believe that all other religions have gone astray in their present form). The completion and consummation of the development of religion came about with the coming of Muhammad; and that the perfection of the ‘manifestation’ of Muhammad's prophethood and of the conveyance of his message was destined to occur with the coming of the Mahdi.

The Ahmadiyya Muslim Community are not Muslims but regard Mirza Ghulam Ahmad, who claimed to be the promised Messiah ("Second Coming of Christ") the Mahdi awaited by the Muslims and a 'subordinate' prophet to Muhammad whose job was to restore the Sharia given to Muhammad by guiding or rallying disenchanted Ummah back to Islam and thwart attacks on Islam by its opponents, as the "Promised One" of all religions fulfilling eschatological prophecies found in the scriptures of the Abrahamic religions, as well as Zoroastrianism, the Indian religions, Native American traditions and others. Ahmadi Muslims believe that Ahmad was divinely commissioned as a true reflection of Muhammad's prophethood to establish the unity of God and to remind mankind of their duties towards God and God's creation.

See also

References

Further reading

External links 

 The Four Sunni Schools of Thought
 Ask Imam – Islam Q&A
 Online Islamic Learning
 Sufism – Islamic Science of Spirituality